Ira Foster Lewis (August 25, 1883 - September 4, 1948) was an American sportswriter, executive editor, president, and business manager of the Pittsburgh Courier.  He was involved in the Double V campaign to grant full citizenship rights to African American soldiers serving in World War II and helped integrate major league baseball.

Lewis was born in Lexington, North Carolina. He studied at Biddle Academy for one year.

Along with Robert L. Vann and Bill Nunn, he helped lead the paper.

He was a leader in the National Negro Publishers Association. In 1937 he corresponded with W. E. B. Du Bois.

Lewis was photographed with his family in Homewood by Charles "Teenie" Harris.

References

1883 births
1948 deaths
Editors of Pennsylvania newspapers
Journalists from Pennsylvania
Writers from Pittsburgh
Businesspeople from Pittsburgh
African-American history in Pittsburgh
People from Lexington, North Carolina
African-American journalists
American male journalists
20th-century American businesspeople
20th-century African-American people